This list of historically black colleges and universities (HBCUs) includes institutions of higher education in the United States that were established before 1964 with the intention of primarily serving the black community.

Alabama leads the nation with the number of HBCUs, followed by North Carolina, then Georgia.

The list of closed colleges includes many that, because of state laws, were racially segregated. In other words, those colleges are not just "historically" black, they were entirely black for as long as they existed.

Current institutions

Notes

Defunct institutions

Notes

References

Black
African American-related lists